Tom King (October 7, 1895 – January 4, 1972) was an American football, basketball, and baseball coach. He served as the head football coach at the University of Louisville from 1925 to 1930, compiling a record of 27–21.

Kind died in Jasper, Indiana on January 4, 1972, at the age of 76.

Head coaching record

College football

References

1895 births
1972 deaths
American men's basketball players
Basketball coaches from Indiana
Basketball players from Indiana
Louisville Cardinals athletic directors
Louisville Cardinals baseball coaches
Louisville Cardinals football coaches
Louisville Cardinals men's basketball coaches
Notre Dame Fighting Irish football players
Notre Dame Fighting Irish men's basketball players
High school football coaches in Kentucky
People from Boone County, Indiana